The Best of Roberta Flack is Roberta Flack's first compilation album, released in 1981.

Track listing
"Killing Me Softly with His Song" - (Charles Fox, Norman Gimbel) (4.13)
"The Closer I Get to You" - (Reggie Lucas, James Mtume) (4.39)
performed by Roberta Flack & Donny Hathaway
"You've Got a Friend" - (Carole King) (3.20)
performed by Roberta Flack & Donny Hathaway
"Feel Like Makin' Love" - (Eugene McDaniels) (2.55)
"Will You Still Love Me Tomorrow" - (Gerry Goffin, Carole King) (3.59)
"Where Is the Love" - (William Slater, Ralph MacDonald) (2.43)
performed by Roberta Flack & Donny Hathaway
"The First Time Ever I Saw Your Face" - (Ewan MacColl) (4.15)
"Back Together Again" - (Reggie Lucas, James Mtume) (4.49)
performed by Roberta Flack & Donny Hathaway
"You Are My Heaven" - (Stevie Wonder, Eric Mercury) (4.10)
performed by Roberta Flack & Donny Hathaway
"If Ever I See You Again" - (Joe Brooks) (3.34)
"Jesse" - (Janis Ian) (4.00)

Certifications

References

Roberta Flack albums
1981 greatest hits albums
Atlantic Records compilation albums